Varujan Vosganian (born on 25 July 1958) is a Romanian politician, economist, essayist and poet of Armenian origin. Vosganian was Romania's Minister of Economy and Commerce (2006–2008) in the Tăriceanu cabinet and Minister of Economy in the Ponta cabinet (2012–2013). He is the President of The Union of Armenians in Romania (UAR, 1990–present) and the Prime-vice president of the Union of Writers in Romania (2005–present). His books have been translated into more than 20 languages.

Biography

Varujan Vosganian was born in Craiova to a family of Armenian ethnicity. His grandparents were survivors of the genocide against Armenian people which took place in the Ottoman Empire in 1915. Vosganian studied at the Alexandru Ioan Cuza High School in Focșani. He then studied Commerce at the Bucharest Academy of Economic Studies (graduated 1982) and Mathematics at the University of Bucharest (graduated 1991), gaining a Ph.D. in economics in 1998.

After participating in the Romanian Revolution in 1989, he has been a member of the Romanian Parliament since the first free elections in 1990. In 1990, he became president of The Union of Armenians in Romania and he was twice (1990–1992 and 1992–1996) elected a member of the Chamber of Deputies, and a Senator (1996–2000, on the lists of the Union of Right Forces, and 2004–2016, on the lists of the National Liberal Party). Between 1996 and 2003, he was the leader of the Union of Right Forces (Uniunea Forţelor de Dreapta), a right wing liberal party, which eventually merged into the National Liberal Party (PNL) in 2003. Having served as minister for Economy and Finance between 2006 and 2008, Vosganian was minister of commerce from 2012 to 2013.

Since 2016, he has been a member of the Chamber of Deputies on the lists of the Alliance of Liberals and Democrats for Europe (ALDE).

Along with non-fiction works on economics, Vosganian has also published many essays and literary texts, such as a volume of poems, short stories and novels. The international recognition came with The Book of Whispers (2009), translated in more than twenty languages. Presented in different events (public lectures, essays, workshops, screenings and dramatisations) in more than forty countries from all the continents, The Book of Whispers became the book-symbol against the crime of genocide.

Vosganian speaks Armenian, Romanian, English, French, Italian, and Spanish.

Prizes and awards 
Literary prizes and awards
 Prize of the Association of Writers in Bucharest for the best prose of the year – 1994
 Great Prize for Poetry Nichita Stănescu (Chișinău, Republic of Moldavia) – 2006
 Prize for the best book of the year, awarded by the Romania Literară literary magazine (2009)
 Prize for the best prose of the year, awarded by Convorbiri Literare literary magazine (2009)
 Prize for the best prose of the year, awarded by the Romanian Academy, 2009
 Prize for the best prose of the year and the Prize of readers, awarded by Observatorul Cultural Magazine (2010)
 Prize for the best prose of the year, awarded by Viața Românească Literary Magazine – 2010
 Prize for the best prose of the year awarded by Argeș literary magazine (2010)
 Nomination for the best prose of the year – Union of Writers in Romania (2009,2013)
 Niram Art Prize for poetry Tristan Tzara and for prose Mihail Sebastian, awarded by Niram Art Foundation, Madrid, 2010
 Nomination for the best translation of the year, Leipzig Bookfair, 2014
 The Angelus Award, The Prize of the Readers Natalia Gorbanevskaia and The Prize for the best translation of the year, Wrocław, 2016
Other Awards:
 Doctor Honoris Causa, awarded by Vasile Goldis University of Arad, 2006
 Romanian Academy Award for the contribution to the development of Romanian science and culture, 2006
 Gold Medal for Culture, awarded by the Government of Armenia, 2006, 2013
 Order "Nerses Shnorhali" awarded by the Catholicos of the Armenian Apostolic Church, 2006
 "Ordine della Solidarieta Italiana" awarded by President Giorgio Napolitano of Republic of Italy, 2008
 Order "Cilician Knight" awarded by the Great House of Cilicia Catholicosate, 2008
 "St. Andrew's Cross", awarded by the Romanian Patriarchate, 2008
 Medal "Movses Khorenatzi" awarded by President Serge Sarksian of Republic of Armenia, 2011
 Medal "William Saroyan" awarded by the Government of Armenia, 2012

Publications

Economics 
 Jurnalul de front: articole economice, Bucharest, Staff, 1994;
 Contradicțiile tranziției la o economie de piață, Bucharest, Expert, 1994;
 Reforma piețelor financiare din România, Iași, Polirom, 1999.

Literature 
 Copiii războiului (The Children of War), novel, Polirom, 2016
 Cartea poemelor mele nescrise (The Book of my Unwritten Poems),  poems, Cartea Românească, 2015 – around 2500 books sold
 Jocul celor o sută de frunze și alte povestiri (The Game of Hundred Leaves and Other Stories), stories, Polirom, 2013 – around 3500 copies sold
 Cartea șoaptelor (The Book of Whispers), novel, Polirom, Iasi, 2009, 2012 – more than 60.000 copies sold
 Iisus cu o mie de brațe (Jesus with a Thousand Arms), poems, Dacia, 2005
 Ochiul cel alb al reginei (The White Eye of the Queen), poems, bilingual (Romanian – English) Cartea Romaneasca, 2001
 Statuia Comandorului (The Statue of Commander), stories, Ararat, 1994
 Șamanul Albastru (The Blue Shaman) volume of poems, Ararat, 1994
Translations:
 A kék sámán (Șamanul Albastru), AB – ART (2009), poems, Hungarian translation
 El libro de los susurros (Cartea șoaptelor), Pre – Textos (2010), Spanish translation by Joaquin Garrigos
 Il libro dei sussurri (Cartea șoaptelor), Kellerdi Rovereto Trento (2011), Italian translation by Anita Natascia Bernacchia
 Șșukneri Matian (Cartea șoaptelor), Writers' Union of Armenia (2012), Antares (2014, second edition), Armenian translation by Sergiu Selian
 Sefer Halehishot (Cartea șoaptelor), Hakibbutz Hameuchad (2012), Hebrew translation by Any Shilon
 Le livre des chuchotements (Cartea șoaptelor), Editions des Syrtes (2013), French translation by Laure Hinckel și Marily Le Nir
 Viskningarnas bok (Cartea șoaptelor), 2244 (2013), Swedish translation by Inger Johansson
 Buch des Flüsterns (Cartea șoaptelor), Zsolnay Verlag (2013), Büchergilde Gutemberg (2015), German translation by Ernest Wichner
 Proșepnata kniga (Cartea șoaptelor), Avangard Print (2013), Bulgarian translation by Vanina Bojikova
 Suttogások könyve (Cartea șoaptelor), Orpheusz (2014), Hungarian translation by Zsolt Karácsony
 Livro dos Sussuros (Cartea șoaptelor), Digital edition (2015), Portuguese translation by Ernest Wichner
 Pecipeci name (Cartea șoaptelor), Ketabe Miamak (2015), Persan translation by Garoon Sarkisean
 Księga szeptów (Cartea șoaptelor), Książkowe Klimaty (2015), Polish translation by Joanna Kornaś-Warwas
 Het Boek der Fluisteringen (Cartea șoaptelor), Uitgeverij Pegasus (2015), Dutch translation Jan Willem Bos
 Kniha šepotů (Cartea șoaptelor), Havran (2016), Czech translation by Jarmila Horakova
 Igra na sto lista i drugi razkazi (Jocul celor o sută de frunze și alte povestiri), SONM (2016), Bulgarian translation by Vanina Bojikova
 Das Spiel der hundert Blätter (Jocul celor o sută de frunze și alte povestiri), Zsolnay Verlag (2016), German translation by Ernest Wichner
 Hviskingenes bok (Cartea șoaptelor), Bokvennen (2017), Norwegian translation by Steinar Lone
 Knjiga šapata (Cartea șoaptelor), Sandorf (2017), Croatian translation by Ana Brnardic Oproiu and Adrian Oproiu
 The Book of Whispers (Cartea șoaptelor), Yale University Press (2017), English translation by Alistair Ian Blyth
To be published in 2017–2018:
 Laguna Publishing House, Serbian translation of The Book of Whispers
 V.Books – XXI, Ukrainian Translation of The Book of Whispers
The Book of Whispers

Vosganian said during one of his interviews: "The book was written between 2003 and 2008. I do not know when I got the idea to write it, maybe I always had this thought. The Book of Whispers is, at the same time, autobiography, fiction and historical document. The characters and the events recounted are true. What I have added is the power of symbols. I used both the memory of my family and testimonies of survivors or historical documents. The book presents the biography of the twentieth century; The Armenian Genocide; The Communism in Eastern Europe; How to surpass a common trauma; How to choose between oblivion, revenge and forgiveness (the fundamental option of the human condition: to forgive – to revenge – to forget)."

Other 
 Founding member of the Romanian Society of Economy (SOREC) 
 Member of the Board of International Experts of the Centre for European Policy Studies based in Brussels (1992–1995) 
 Honorary member of the Scientific Council of the National Institute of Economic Foresight 
 Senior Researcher of the National Institute of Economics in Romania 
 Honorary Member of The Romanian Chamber of Commerce

References

  CV at Varujan Vosganian's site 
  "Varujan Vosganian, comisar european", in Evenimentul Zilei, 25 October 2006

1958 births
Ethnic Armenian politicians
Bucharest Academy of Economic Studies alumni
Living people
Members of the Chamber of Deputies (Romania)
Members of the Senate of Romania
National Liberal Party (Romania) politicians
People from Craiova
Romanian economists
Romanian essayists
Romanian Ministers of Finance
Romanian people of Armenian descent
Romanian male poets
University of Bucharest alumni
Male essayists